The Garvin Rock Church is a historic church at Love and Williams Streets in Garvin, Oklahoma.  Also known as Old Rock Church, it was built in 1910 and added to the National Register in 1980.

It was an impressive church for its small town, when completed in 1910. It has two sets of stained glass windows.

In 2001, the church was in disrepair and deemed too expensive to repair.

References

Churches in Oklahoma
Churches on the National Register of Historic Places in Oklahoma
Churches completed in 1910
Buildings and structures in McCurtain County, Oklahoma
National Register of Historic Places in McCurtain County, Oklahoma